Air Marshal Sir John Henry D'Albiac,  (28 January 1894 – 20 August 1963) was a senior commander in the Royal Air Force during the Second World War.  Notably he was the British air commander for the Battle of Greece.

Biography

D'Albiac was educated at the Seabrook Lodge School in Kent, Framlingham College and the Royal Military College, Sandhurst.  He was commissioned into the Royal Marine Artillery in 1914 but seconded to the Royal Naval Air Service during the following year. In 1916, whilst serving in France as an aeroplane observer, D'Albiac was awarded the Distinguished Service Order. After serving as Station Commander at RAF Scopwick he transferred to the RAF on its establishment in 1918 and served on the Staff at Headquarters RAF Trans-Jordania from 1922 and as a Flight Commander in No. 99 Squadron from 1926.

During the Second World War D'Albiac served as Air Officer Commanding RAF Palestine and Transjordan from August 1939, Air Officer Commanding British Forces in Greece from November 1940 before returning to be Air Officer Commanding RAF Palestine and Transjordan from May 1941 again. He continued his war service as Air Officer Commanding British Forces in Iraq from June 1941, Air Officer Commanding No. 222 Group in Ceylon from March 1942 and Air Officer Commanding No. 2 Group in the UK from December 1942. He was then made Air Officer Commanding Second Tactical Air Force in June 1943, Deputy Commander of the Mediterranean Tactical Air Force in February 1944 and the Director-General of Personnel in November 1944. He retired in 1947.

In later life D'Albiac was the Aerodrome Commandant at London Heathrow Airport and the Deputy Chairman of the Air Transport Advisory Council. He died in Beaconsfield on 20 August 1963.

Notes

References

External links

 Royal Air Force – Bomber Command Commanders of World War II

|-

|-

1894 births
1963 deaths
Commanders of the Legion of Merit
Companions of the Distinguished Service Order
Companions of the Order of the Bath
Graduates of the Royal Military College, Sandhurst
Grand Commanders of the Order of the Phoenix (Greece)
Grand Officers of the Order of Orange-Nassau
Knights Commander of the Order of the British Empire
Knights Commander of the Royal Victorian Order
People educated at Framlingham College
Royal Air Force air marshals of World War II
Royal Marines officers
Royal Naval Air Service aviators
Royal Naval Air Service personnel of World War I
Royal Marines personnel of World War I